Zoltán Pék (born 1962 December 20) is a politician in Serbia from the country's Hungarian community. He was the mayor of Senta from 2008 to 2010 and served in the National Assembly of Serbia from 2012 to 2022. Pék is a member of the Alliance of Vojvodina Hungarians (Vajdasági Magyar Szövetség, VMSZ).

Early life and career
Pék was born in Senta, Autonomous Province of Vojvodina, in what was then the People's Republic of Serbia in the Federal People's Republic of Yugoslavia. He was raised in the community and later graduated from the Faculty of Economics at the University of Novi Sad in Subotica, focusing on business information systems. He is an authorized accountant and auditor.

Politician

Early years (2004–12)
Pék joined the VMSZ in 2002. He was a civilian member of Senta's budget and finance committee in the 2004–08 term and served as the committee's president.

He received the 123rd position on the VMSZ's electoral list in the 2007 Serbian parliamentary election and the forty-third position on the VMSZ-led Hungarian Coalition list in the 2008 parliamentary election. The lists won three and four mandates, respectively, and Pék was not included in his party's assembly delegation on either occasion. (From 2000 to 2011, Serbian parliamentary mandates were awarded to sponsoring parties or coalitions rather than to individual candidates, and it was common practice for mandates to be assigned out of numerical order. Pék could have been awarded a mandate on either occasion despite his relatively low list position, though in fact he was not.)

Pék also appeared in the third position on the Hungarian Coalition's list for the Senta municipal assembly in the 2008 Serbian local elections, which were held concurrently with the parliamentary vote. The list won a plurality victory with twelve out of twenty-nine mandates, and Pék was assigned a mandate. When the assembly convened on 7 August 2008, he was chosen as the municipality's mayor. He remained in this role until February 2010, when shifting political alliances brought the Democratic Party (Demokratska stranka, DS) to power in a new administration that did not include the VMSZ. Pék returned to the municipal assembly on 15 June 2010 and led the VMSZ delegation there for the next two years.

Parliamentarian (2012–2022)
Serbia's electoral system was reformed in 2011, such that parliamentary mandates were awarded in numerical order to candidates on successful lists. Pék received the fifth position on the VMSZ's list in the 2012 parliamentary election and was elected when the list won five mandates. The Serbian Progressive Party (Srpska napredna stranka, SNS) and its allies won the election and formed a coalition government with the Socialist Party of Serbia (Socijalistička partija Srbije, SPS) and other parties; the VMSZ turned down an offer to join the government and served in opposition (at least nominally) in the parliament that followed. Pék became a member of Serbia's delegation to the Parliamentary Assembly of the Black Sea Economic Cooperation (PABSEC) in his first term, succeeding fellow party member Elvira Kovács. He was also a member of the committee on finance, state budget, and control of public spending; a deputy member of the agriculture, forestry, and water management committee; and a member of the parliamentary friendship groups with France and Romania.

Pék again received the fifth position on the VMSZ's list in the 2014 election and was re-elected when the list won six mandates. The VMSZ began supporting Serbia's SNS-led government in the parliament that followed. Pék held the same committee assignments and friendship group memberships as in the previous parliament and continued serving with Serbia's delegation to the PABSEC. He was also a deputy member of the committee on justice, public administration, and local self-government and the committee on human and minority rights and gender equality.

He was promoted to the fourth position on the party's list for the 2016 parliamentary election and was returned for a third term even as the list fell to four mandates. He remained a member of Serbia's PABSEC delegation and was for a time the deputy chair of that body's culture, education, and social affairs committee. He also continued to serve as a member of the assembly's finance committee, a deputy member of the agriculture and judiciary committees, and a member of the friendship groups with Azerbaijan and Romania.

The VMSZ led a successful drive to increase its voter turnout in the 2020 Serbian parliamentary election and won a record nine seats. Pék, who once again appeared in the fourth position on its list, was elected to a fourth term. In the term that followed, he was a member of the finance and human rights committees, a deputy member of the justice committee; a member of the subcommittee for the consideration of reports on audits conducted by the state audit institution; a member of the human rights committee's working group for initiatives, petitions and proposals; once again a member of Serbia's delegation to the PABSEC; and a member of the friendship groups with Romania and Slovenia. Pék also appeared in the third position on the VMSZ's list for Senta in the 2020 Serbian local elections and returned to the municipal assembly after an eight-year absence when the list won a plurality victory with thirteen out of twenty-nine mandates.

He was assigned the fifteenth position on the VMSZ's list in the 2022 parliamentary election and was not re-elected as the list fell to five seats. His assembly term ended on 1 August 2022. It is possible, though unlikely, that he could return to the assembly as the replacement for another party member at some time in the current term.

References

1962 births
Living people
People from Senta
Mayors of places in Serbia
Members of the National Assembly (Serbia)
Members of the Parliamentary Assembly of the Black Sea Economic Cooperation
Alliance of Vojvodina Hungarians politicians